The Taichung Baseball Field is a multi-purpose stadium in North District, Taichung, Taiwan. Built in 1935 during the Taiwan under Japanese rule era, this stadium has been repeatedly refurbished and currently can seat 8,500 people. This stadium has been the home of professional baseball teams such as Jungo Bears (1993–1995), Sinon Bears (first half 1996), Sinon Bulls(second half 1996–2012) of Chinese Professional Baseball League (CPBL) and Taichung Agan(1997–2002) of Taiwan Major League (TML).

This stadium has long been a part of the National Taiwan College of Physical Education's campus and caused certain inconvenience when hosting professional baseball games. A new baseball stadium, the Taichung Intercontinental Baseball Stadium, opened in November 2006 to host the 2006 Intercontinental Cup, and it became the new home of the Sinon Bulls starting in 2010 season.

Taichung Baseball Field no longer hosts professional baseball games and is only used for educational and training purposes.

See also
 List of stadiums in Taiwan
 Sport in Taiwan

References

Baseball venues in Taiwan
Buildings and structures in Taichung
Multi-purpose stadiums in Taiwan
Sport in Taichung
1935 establishments in Taiwan